The Kastelruther Spatzen (German for Kastelruth sparrows) are a musical group from South Tyrol, northern Italy, who have won many honours and awards for their schlager in folk music style.

Members
The Kastelruther Spatzen were formed in 1976 by Karl Schieder, Walter Mauroner, Valentin Silbernagl, Oswald Sattler, Ferdinand Rier and Anton Rier. Anton Rier left in 1977, and Norbert Rier joined as the drummer in 1979. Ferdinand Rier left in 1980 and was replaced by Albin Gross. In 1983, with this line-up, they released their first single, Das Mädchen mit den erloschenen Augen, which was awarded a golden disc.

In 1986, Karl Schieder left the group to pursue another career, and was replaced by Karl Heufler. In 1991 Rüdiger Hemmelmann joined the band as a drummer. In 1993, Oswald Sattler left for a solo career, and was replaced by Andreas Fulterer, who left five years later also for a solo career. He was then replaced by Kurt Dasser.

Karl Schieder
Karl Schieder is the founder of the Kastelruther Spatzen and played the baritone. In 1986 he left the band for personal reasons.

Valentin Silbernagl
Valentin Silbernagl was born on 18 June 1956 in Kastelruth and played for eight years in the Musikkapelle Kastelruth before joining the Kastelruther Spatzen. He married in 1982 and has three children.

Walter Mauroner
Walter Mauroner was born on 20 June 1956 in Bozen and played for fifteen years in the Musikkapelle Kastelruth before joining the Kastelruther Spatzen, where he plays the trumpet. He married in 1984 and has two children. He is the owner of the fan shop, the Spatzenladen, in Kastelruth.

Oswald Sattler
Oswald Sattler was born on 7 December 1957 in Kastelruth, and played guitar and sang with the Kastelruther Spatzen until he left them in 1993. He started a solo career in 1996, and has won the Grand Prix der Volksmusik once and the Goldene Stimmgabel twice. He sings with the group Die Bergkameraden and won the German national round of the Grand Prix der Volksmusik with them in 2009 to reach the final.

Ferdinand Rier
One of the original members of the Kastelruther Spatzen, Ferdinand Rier left the group in 1980 to start a family.

Anton Rier
One of the original members of the Kastelruther Spatzen, Anton Rier was the first member to leave the group, in 1977.

Norbert Rier
Norbert Rier is the lead singer of the Kastelruther Spatzen. He was born on 14 April 1960, is married to Isabella and has four children, with two of whom he has recorded songs - Marion in 1994 and Andreas in 2004. He joined the Kastelruther Spatzen as drummer and singer in late 1979. In May 2006, his autobiography was published, Danke Fans! Die authentische Autobiographie des Kastelruther Spatzen Chefs, BLV Buchverlag, München 2006, . He is the uncle of Denise Karbon and Peter Fill.

Albin Gross
Albin Gross was born on 2 April 1955 in Kastelruth. He married in 1980 and has three daughters. Before Karl Schieder brought him into the Kastelruther Spatzen in 1980, where he plays keyboard and accordion, and is also a composer and lyricist, he performed with the Seiser Buam.

Karl Heufler
Karl Heufler was born on 23 September 1959 in Kastelruth. He married in 1984 and has two children. He played in the Musikkapelle Seis am Schlern and in the Schlernsextett before he joined the Kastelruther Spatzen in 1986 as a replacement for Karl Schieder, playing bass guitar and horn.

Rüdiger Hemmelmann
Rüdiger Hemmelmann was born on 13 March 1966 in Würzburg. Since 1991 he is the drummer of the Kastelruther Spatzen.

Andreas Fulterer † 
Andreas Fulterer was born on 27 February 1961 in Kastelruth and joined the Kastelruther Spatzen in 1993, when he replaced Oswald Sattler and left again in 1998. In his solo career that followed, he moved away from folk music to schlager. He died on 26 October 2016 after he suffered from lung cancer.

Kurt Dasser
Kurt Dasser was born on 8 February 1958 in Bolzano. He worked for twenty years in Bolzano as a mathematics and biology teacher. He is divorced and has a son. He plays guitar and sings with the Kastelruther Spatzen.

Kastelruther Spatzenfest

The Kastelruther Spatzenfest is a concert which has been held annually since 1984. In 2005 there were approximately 30,000 people attending it.

Discography

Albums
 Viel Spaß und Freude, 1983
 Ich sag's Dir mit Musik, 1985
 Musikantengold, 1986
 Servus Südtirol, 1987
 Weihnachtssterne, 1987
 Wenn Berge träumen, 1988
 Doch die Sehnsucht bleibt, 1989
 Feuer im ewigen Eis, 1990. GER: Gold
 Wahrheit ist ein schmaler Grat, 1991. GER: Gold
 Eine weiße Rose, 1992. GER: Gold
 Die schönsten Liebeslieder der Kastelruther Spatzen, 1992
 Der rote Diamant, 1993. GER: Gold
 Das Mädchen mit den erloschenen Augen, 1993
 Spreng Die ketten Der Einsamkeit, 1994
 Atlantis der Berge, 1994. GER: Gold
 Nino und das Geheimnis des Friedens, 1994
 Das erste Gebot ist die Liebe, 1995. GER: Gold
 Sterne über'm Rosengarten, 1996. GER: Gold
 Herzschlag für Herzschlag, 1997. GER: Gold
 Die weiße Braut der Berge, 1998
 Weihnachten mit den Kastelruhter Spatzen, 1998
 Die Legende von Croderes, 1999
 Und ewig wird der Himmel brennen, 2000. GER: Gold
 Jedes Abendrot ist ein Gebet, 2001. GER: Gold
 Ihre Ersten Erfolge, 2001
 Liebe darf alles, 2002. GER: Gold
 Das Frühlingsfest der Volksmusik - Das Gold-Jubiläum der Kastelruther Spatzen Doppel-CD, 2002
 Herzenssache, 2003. GER: Gold
 Alles Gold dieser Erde, 2003. GER: Gold
 16 Spatzen-Hits Instrumental, 2004
 Berg ohne Wiederkehr, 2004. GER: Platinum
 Zufall oder Schicksal, 2005. GER: Gold
 Nino und das Geheimnis des Friedens, 2005 (Remake with 2 extra titles)
 Und Singen ist Gold, 2006. GER: Gold
 Dolomitenfeuer, 2007. GER: Gold
 Geschrieben für die Ewigkeit - Besinnliche Lieder, 2008 (Bonus Album)
 Jeder Tag ist eine Rose, 2008 (Bonus Album)
 Herz gewinnt, Herz verliert, 2008. GER: Gold
 Ein Kreuz und eine Rose, 2009. GER: Gold
 Immer noch wie am ersten Tag, 2010.
 Hand auf's Herz, 2011.
 Weihnachten bei uns daheim, 2011.
 Leben und leben lassen, 2012.
 Planet der Lieder, 2013.
 Eine Brücke ins Glück, 2014
 Heimat - Deine Lieder, 2015
 Die Sonne scheint für alle, 2016
 Die Tränen der Dolomiten, 2017
 Älter werden wir später, 2018
 Feuervogel flieg, 2019
 Liebe für die Ewigkeit, 2020
 HeimatLiebe, 2021
 HeimatLiebe Weihnacht, 2021

Live albums
 Kastelruther Spatzen live in Berlin, 1996

Compilation albums
 Das Beste der Kastelruther Spatzen Folge 1, 1991
 Kastelruther Classics Folge 1, 1994
 Das Beste der Kastelruther Spatzen Folge 2, 1995. GER: Gold
 Träume von Liebe und Zärtlichkeit, 1996
 Kastelruther Classics Folge 2, 1997
 Das Beste der Kastelruther Spatzen Folge 3, 2001. GER: Gold
 25 Jahre Kastelruther Spazen, 2009
 Engel der Dolomiten, 2012
 Apres Ski – Kult-Hits im Party, 2015
 Das Beste aus 35 Jahren, 2018

DVDs
 Das Beste Folge 1. GER: Gold
 Das Beste Folge 2. GER: Gold
 Herzschlag für Herzschlag. GER: Gold
 Das große Kastelruther Spatzenfest
 Ich würd es wieder tun
 Berg ohne Wiederkehr. GER: Gold
 Dolomitenfeuer. GER: Gold

Singles
 "Das Mädchen mit den erloschenen Augen" (1983)
 "Tränen passen nicht zu Dir" (1990)
 "Feuer im ewigen Eis" (1990)
 "Spreng die Ketten Deiner Einsamkeit" (1991)
 "Wahrheit ist ein schmaler Grat" (1991)
 "Eine weiße Rose" (1992)
 "Schatten über'm Rosenhof" (1992)
 "Und ewig ruft die Heimat" (1993)
 "Der rote Diamant" (1993)
 "Atlantis der Berge" (1994)
 "Che bella la vita" (1994)
 "Du gehörst in meine Arme" (1994)
 "Das Lied der Dornenvögel" (1996)
 "Herzschlag für Herzschlag" (1997)
 "Ich schwör" (1997)
 "Die weiße Braut der Berge" (1998)
 "Und ewig wird der Himmel brennen" (2000)
 "Ein Leben lang" (2000)
 "Jeder Tag ist eine Rose" (2000)
 "Jedes Abendrot ist ein Gebet" (2001)
 "Liebe darf alles" (2002)
 "Herzenssache" (2003)
 "Berg ohne Wiederkehr" (2004)
 "Zufall oder Schicksal" (2005)
 "Gott hatte einen Traum" (2005)
 "... und Singen ist Gold" (2006)
 "Das Geheimnis der drei Worte" (2007)

Honours and awards
 Grand Prix der Volksmusik 1990 for Germany (Tränen passen nicht zu dir)
 Edelweiß 1991 and 1993
 ECHO in the category Schlager/folk music: 1993, 1996, 1997, 1998 in the category Folk music with Dieter Thomas Kuhn & Band winning the category Schlager, 1999 in the category Folk music with Guildo Horn & die orthopädischen Strümpfe winning the category Schlager, 2000 in the category Folk music with Die Flippers winning the category Schlager, 2001, 2003, 2006, 2007, 2008, 2009, 2010
 Goldene Stimmgabel 1996, 1997, 1999, 2003, 2007
 Krone der Volksmusik: 1998, 2000, 2001, 2002, 2005, 2006, 2007, 2008, 2009, 2010
 Amadeus Austrian Music Award nominations 2001, 2002, 2003, 2004, 2005, 2006

Further reading
 Die Kastelruther Spatzen aus Südtirol, Published by Tappeiner, 2002

References

External links
 Official website in German
 Spatzenmuseum and Spatzenladen in Kastelruth in German
 Biography in Koch Music in German
 Konzerte in Südtirol in German

Culture of South Tyrol
Musical groups established in 1976
Italian musical groups
1976 establishments in Italy